Equator is a 2006 BBC television documentary series in three parts charting presenter Simon Reeve's journey along the Equator through Africa, Asia and South America.
He traveled through Gabon, Democratic Republic of the Congo, Uganda, Kenya, Indonesia, Ecuador, Colombia and Brazil. Republic of the Congo was skipped due to threats against foreigners at the time, and Somalia was skipped due to ongoing conflict in the area.

External links
 
 BBC TV programmes: Equator.
 

2006 British television series debuts
2006 British television series endings
2000s British documentary television series
BBC television documentaries
2000s British television miniseries
English-language television shows